Convicted is a 1931 American pre-Code film directed by Christy Cabanne and starring Aileen Pringle and Jameson Thomas.

Tony Blair, a producer of Broadway plays, is murdered on a California-bound passenger liner, and a series of events leads to an assumption that Claire Norvelle has committed the killing. Despite the fact that Blair was an obnoxious character, murder is murder and Barbara is accused of the crime. Complications arise when another murder occurs. The startling solution clears Barbara and provides a surprising explanation of the two murders.

Cast 
Aileen Pringle as Claire Norville
Jameson Thomas as Bruce Allan
Dorothy Christy as Constance Forbes
Richard Tucker as Tony Blair
Harry Myers as Sturgeon
Niles Welch as Roy Fenton
Jack Mower as Henderson
Wilfred Lucas as Captain Hammond
Wild Bill Elliott (credited as Gordon Elliott) as Passenger

Reception 
The Motion Picture Guide, first published in 1985, describes Convicted as a "nicely developed murder mystery". However, in his 2010 biography and guide Wild Bill Elliot: A Complete Filmography, author Gene Blottner characterizes the film as "an adequate but undistinguished low-budget murder mystery".

References

External links

1931 films
1930s mystery films
American black-and-white films
1930s romance films
Films directed by Christy Cabanne
American mystery films
American romance films
1930s English-language films
1930s American films